Devadasu is a 2006 Indian Telugu-language romantic drama film directed and produced by Y. V. S. Chowdary. The film features the debutants Ram and Ileana in the lead roles while Sayaji Shinde plays supporting role.

Released on 11 January 2006, the film was commercially successful. Both Ram and Ileana won Filmfare Awards South for Best Debut. The film was remade in Bengali as Paglu (2011) and in Hindi as Loveyatri (2018). It was later dubbed into Malayalam under the same name.

Plot
Devdas is a poor student, while Bhanumati is a rich NRI girl whose father Katamraju is the senator of New York. They fall in love when Bhanu comes to India to learn classical Carnatic music. Coming to know about their love, Katamraju hatches a plan to separate them. He promises to get them married but takes his daughter and mother-in-law back to the USA. The rest of the story is how Devdas makes it to the USA and succeeds in attaining his girl.

Cast

Soundtrack
The music was composed by Chakri and released by Aditya Music with lyrics written by Sirivennela and Chandrabose.

Box office

Awards
Filmfare Award for Best Male Debut - South - Ram
Filmfare Award for Best Female Debut - South - Ileana D'Cruz

References

External links
 

2006 films
2000s Telugu-language films
Telugu films remade in other languages
Films directed by Y. V. S. Chowdary
Indian romantic comedy-drama films
Films scored by Chakri
Indian drama films
Indian romance films